Ivan Fedorovich Choultsé (October 21, 1874, Saint-Petersburg, Russia – 1939, Nice, France) – Russian landscape realistic painter.

Biography

Early years 
He was born in Saint-Petersburg, Russia, into a family of German origin (Schultze — original spelling of his family name – had lived in Russia since the 17th century). His first education was in electrical engineering. At the same time he tried to paint landscapes. When he was already thirty years old, he showed his first essays to a famous painter and member of Russian Academy of fine arts Constantin Jakovlevich Kryzhitsky (1858) —1911), who then invited Choultsé to study art. Other significant influences were Ukrainian painter Arkhip Ivanovich Kuindzhi (1841 —1910) and Swiss painter Alexander Calame (1810–1864).

Together with Kryzhitsky in 1910 Choultsé travelled to Spitzbergen, where he painted many Arctic landscapes (Datskiy and Medvezhiy islands, Saint Magdalene's bay of the Spitzbergen archipelago etc.).

After losing both of his teachers (Kuindzhi died in 1910 and Kryzhitsky committed suicide the year after) Choultsé begins to master his very own style of painting. Grand Duchess Olga Alexandrovna (1882–1960), being also a pupil of Kryzhitsly, founded a Society in the name of her late teacher and Choultsé frequently participated in its exhibitions, that took place in her palace on Sergeevskaya street, 46/48 (now Tchaikovskogo str.).

By 1916 Choultsé is already a widely famous artist, members of the Tsar family acquire his works (Nicholas II's brother Michael Alexandrovich, Grand Duke Grigoriy Mikhailovich and others). The Tsar himself is not much interested: as Choultsé noted later, in emigration, Nicholas II displayed no interest in landscapes or still lives, as they "told no story". Some works were bought by Сarl Fabergé (stated in his 1918's inventory). Post card development has greatly contributed to Choultsé's success – printing of his works on those "open letters" made him famous throughout the country.

Post-revolutionary period and emigration 
Just like many "academic" painters, Choultsé was in great uncertainty during revolutionary years. He decides to go on a lengthy trip to Europe: it continued from 1917 till 1919. During it he painted many views of Swiss Alps, southern France and northern Italy. After the trip he briefly returned to Russia a few times.

In 1921 Choultsé returns to his homeland for a while in an attempt to win the attention of Soviet public. In Petrograd he joins the society of individualistic painters, whose members were Isaak Izrailevich Brodsky (1883–1939), Ivan Avgustovich Veltz (1866–1926), Juliy Julievich Klever (1850–1924) and Aleksandr Vladimirovich Makovsky (1869–1924). He takes part in two first exhibitions of this society, but then ultimately decides to emigrate for life.

Emigration to France (1921—1927) 
In Paris Choultsé settles on boulevard Pereire 121, and tries to penetrate the artistic milieu of Paris, overloaded both by immigrants and by the rise of many French painters at that time.

The first personal exhibition of 50 works of Ivan Choultsé opened on November 23, 1922 on Rue La Boétie, 2. The Léon Gérard Gallery exhibited Choultsé's "Soir de Novembre" ("November evening") painting at the spring 136th Salon des Artistes Francais in 1923 and then the "Derniers rayons" ("The Last Rays of Light") at the 137th Salon. The Gallery then held annual personal exhibitions of Choultsé's works up to 1925.

Choultsé got French citizenship in 1927.

Fame outside France 
On March 16, 1927 a personal exhibition of Choultsé opened in Arthur Tooth & Sons Gallery on New Bond street, 155. London journal The Studio (1927, Vol. 93) described the event as a sensation in the field of classical painting: Choultsé demonstrated a new approach to the landscape and evoked a wave of interest to the old genre.

American period (1928 – beginning of the 1930s) 
The European fame became international. Édouard Jonas, a prominent figure in French and international art market, owner of exhibition halls both in Paris and New York, offered an exclusive plan of exposing Choultsé's works in the States. On December 1, 1928 in New York gallery of Jonas on East 56th street, 9 opened Choultsé's exhibition with the slogan "It must be seen to be believed". It was open from November 15, 1929 till January 1, 1930 and held 68 works of the artist, that were willingly bought by people from the States, Canada, Argentina, Mexico.

Life in Nice and death 

In mid-1930s Choultsé moves to Nice, France. The last reliable account of meeting him belongs to Alexander Iosifovich Gefter (1885–1956), a marinist painter, member of various underground antibolshevik organisations and mason. He saw Choultsé on March 7, 1936 during a meeting of Russian emigrants in Breton castle on rue Saint Antoine in Nice. His gravestone on Russian Orthodox Cemetery in Nice states 1939 as the year of his death.

Meanwhile, there were some exhibitions of his works held after his departure and even after his death in New York City (April 1936, April 1940 and May 1943) and Oklahoma City (May—June 1938).

Choultsé's works are scarce in Russia, as Russian museums nowadays mostly lack his works, with rare exceptions of Saint Petersburg Arctic and Antarctic Museum and Dagestan Fine Arts Museum. His works can though be frequently found in American and Canadian collections (Hillwood Museum in Washington D.C., WSU Museum of Art (Washington State University), Indianapolis Museum of Art, Montreal Museum of Fine Arts). Many works are part of private collections.

Choultsé's work 

Throughout all his life Choultsé was a singer of nature in his art: he praised its lands, sky, moon, plants. But the most important elements, the true heroes of his paintings were undoubtedly snow and water. The artistic world of Choultsé is a world without people or animals. His preferred type of a landscape is a winter view, frequently not Russian but Swiss. He was called a "magician of light" because of an almost magic realism of his paintings. Toronto art dealer G. Blair Laing wrote in his book Memoirs of an Art Dealer, 1979:He painted spectacular snow scenes in which the light seems to come from behind the canvas and glow. The critics scorned these pictures as photographic and called them non-art – but today this style of painting is called "magic-realism" and is much admired by critics and museum people.

Literature 
Goncharenko V. Zhizn' s veroj v prizvanie. Katalog proizvedenij Ivana Fedorovicha Shul'tce [A Life Believing in One's Calling. A Catalogue of Ivan Fedorovich Choultsé's works] // Fond Choultsé I.F. Zurich, 2016 [in German/Russian]

Goncharenko Vadim, Zatyupa Svetlana, Makhotina Alina, The Magic light of Ivan Choultsé. A catalogue of an exhibition in Novgorod state art museum. Foundation of Ivan Choultsé, Zurich, 2018 [in English/Russian]

Goncharenko Vadim, Zatyupa Svetlana, Makhotina Alina, Papirenko Kristina, The Magic light of Ivan Choultsé. A catalogue of an exhibition "Architecture of light. Ivan Choultsé" in Plyos state historical, architectural and art museum. Foundation of Ivan Choultsé, Zurich & art-space "Solodovnya", Moscow 2021 [in English/Russian]

Gollerbah Je. Vystavka hudozhnikov-individualistov [Exhibition of Individualistic Painters] // Kazanskij muzejnyj vestnik, № 3/6. Kazan', 1921 – S.141 [in Russian]

Kryzhickij G. Sud'ba hudozhnika [The Artist's Fate]. Kiev, 1966 – S. 32, 43 [in Russian]

Severjuhin D. Ja., Lejkind O. L. Hudozhniki russkoj jemigracii (1917—1941) [Russian Emigration Artists]. Sankt-Peterburg, 1994 [in Russian]

References

1877 births
1932 deaths
19th-century painters from the Russian Empire
Russian male painters
20th-century Russian painters
People who emigrated to escape Bolshevism
Emigrants from the Russian Empire to France
Painters from Saint Petersburg
Landscape painters from the Russian Empire
19th-century male artists from the Russian Empire
20th-century Russian male artists